Eureka Operations Pty Ltd (trading as Coles Express) is an Australian chain of convenience stores at Shell Australia petrol stations. Its operations are managed by Coles.

The business venture and corresponding fuel discount offer was launched in July 2003 in response to the similar offer by rival Woolworths some years earlier, proving attractive to shoppers.

Wesfarmers purchased the retail business of Shell Australia multi-site franchisees in 2003 for A$94 million.  Shell is the exclusive supplier of fuel products, leases the service station property to Coles, and maintains the presence of the "pecten" and other Shell branding on the price board and other signage.

In August 2014, Shell sold its Geelong Oil Refinery and Australian petrol stations for $2.9 billion to Vitol. Vitol operates these assets as Viva Energy, which maintains Shell branding on its service stations under a brand licence arrangement.

Approximately 270 independently franchised Shell service stations remain unassociated with Coles Express where the fuel discount offer is not accepted.

History
The Coles Express brand originally referred to a small number of medium-sized supermarkets Coles ran in the central business districts of Melbourne, Sydney and Brisbane. With the launch of Coles' fuel offer, these were rebranded as Coles Central with the service stations taking the Coles Express branding.

The current Coles Express chain began at more than 150 service stations in Victoria on 28 July 2003.  After this initial trial, it was followed by a national roll-out from 1 December the same year, starting with New South Wales, and completed in mid-2004.  The initial success of the discount offer saw fuel shortages in Victoria after the offer began in New South Wales – where Shell's busiest sites are located – as Shell failed to cope with the distribution of a 30 percent increase in demand.

As at July 2021, there were 723 Coles Express service stations and stand-alone convenience sites across Australia. All former Shell multi-site franchisee sites became Coles Express stores. This transition included the petrol stations and stand-alone Shell Select convenience stores in Melbourne's CBD (which closed by December 2006).

On 20 February 2006, 90 vehicle servicing bays at Coles Express service stations (formerly part of Shell's Autoserv and AutoCare network) became Kmart Tyre & Auto Service outlets.

In 2018 Coles Express started trialling standalone convenience sites in Victoria.

Coles and Viva Energy alliance
On 6 February 2019 Coles Express announced a new alliance partnership with their fuel partner Viva Energy (Shell). Under the agreement Viva Energy is responsible for setting the price of fuel and receives the retail fuel margin. Coles Express receives a commission per litre from Viva Energy based on fuel volumes achieved and has no direct exposure to retail fuel price movements.

In addition to setting fuel pricing Viva Energy is the exclusive supplier of fuel, oil and lubricants. Viva also maintains it pecten and Shell branding as well as all fuel dispensing equipment.

Coles Express is responsible for the maintenance of the retail store (including in-store pricing) and the everyday needs of the business.

In September 2022 Coles Group announced it had agreed terms with Viva Energy to sell the Coles Express retail business. As part of the deal Flybuys will remain a partner and Coles will continue stocking its own-branded products. The deal which is subject to approval by the Australian Competition & Consumer Commission and the Foreign Investment Review Board is scheduled to be completed in the second half of 2023.

Fuel discount offer

Current fuel discount offers
When a customer spends over a qualifying amount in one transaction at Coles Supermarkets, Coles Central or Coles Online, they are entitled to a fuel discount of 4c per litre or 8 bonus Flybuys points per litre at Coles Express. This discount is obtained by providing a discount voucher, printed at the bottom of their receipt, and includes all Shell fuels. Coles Express also offers a 10c per litre discount on all Shell fuels when a customer spends $20 or more on qualify products in store, this can be used in addition to the 4c per litre discount voucher.

All discount fuel offers or bonus points offers do not apply to Shell Card, Fleet Card, WEX Motorpass or Motorcharge transactions.

Previous fuel discount offerings
An additional bonus discount was introduced in late 2006, with a further 2c per litre fuel discount when customers spent $2 in-store in the one transaction.  The offer was made permanent in April 2007 after rival Caltex Woolworths created a similar offer of an additional 4c discount if customers spend $5 in the one transaction at their petrol stations. The 2c per litre finished on 1 February 2013. 
Coles Express now offers a "Spend $20 and Save 10 cents per litre" this was launched to an "Everyday" offer in late 2015 and has continued since, variations of this deal are offered occasionally e.g. Buy product X for X dollars and save X cents per litre.

Other variations of the fuel offer have been offered from time to time including:
In the lead-up to Christmas 2006, the 4c offer increased to 10c for customers spending $80 and over in one transaction at Coles Supermarkets; this offer was extended for a further short time in attempt to boost Coles' sales figures.
Liquorland has offered a 20c-per-litre discount offer when customers purchase six bottles of wine in one transaction.
Kmart Tyre & Auto Service has offered a 30c-per-litre discount offer when customers purchased four certain tyres in one transaction.

Gallery

References

External links

Coles Express

Automotive fuel retailers in Australia
Coles Group
Companies based in Melbourne
Convenience stores
2003 establishments in Australia